The Granite Knolls are conspicuous rock outcrops on the northwest flank of Blue Glacier,  west of Hobbs Peak in Victoria Land, Antarctica. This descriptive name was given by the British Antarctic Expedition, 1910–13, under Robert Falcon Scott.

It was named by the Advisory Committee on Antarctic Names after Klaus G. Anderson (died 1991), a civil engineering technician with the United States Geological Survey (USGS), 1960–90; he was a member of the USGS field team which established geodetic control in the Hudson Mountains, Jones Mountains, Thurston Island and Farwell Island areas of Walgreen Coast and Eights Coast during the 1968–69 season.

References 

Hills of Victoria Land
Scott Coast